is a Japanese actor and model. He debuted as an actor in 2008 and has starred in multiple theater and film projects including Musical: The Prince of Tennis 2nd Season, Stage: Touken Ranbu, Kokuchō no Himitsu, and Koisuru Futari.

Since then, he has notably been involved in Marginal #4, Hugtto! PreCure, School Babysitters, Renai Bakumatsu Kareshi, and Dimension High School.

Career

Someya debuted as an actor in 2008.

Filmography

Film

Theatre

Television

Dubbing
Here and Now, Ramon Bayer-Boatwright (Daniel Zovatto)
Star Trek: Picard, Elnor (Evan Evagora)

References

External links
  

21st-century Japanese male actors
Japanese male musical theatre actors
Japanese male stage actors
Japanese male voice actors
Living people
1987 births